Football at the 1969 Maccabiah Games was held in Israel starting on 29 July.

The competition was open for men's teams only. Teams from 14 countries participated. The competition was won by Israel.

As part of the closing ceremony, an exhibition match was played between Israel and River Plate, which ended goalless.

Format
The 14 teams were divided into four groups, two groups of four and two of three. Each team playing the others once. The top team from each group qualified to the semi-finals, while the second-placed team qualified to the 5th-8th place play-off. The other teams in each group were eliminated.

First round

Group A

Group B

Group C

Group D

Knockout round

5th-8th places play-off

Semi-finals

7th-8th place match

5th-6th place match

Championship play-off

Semi-finals

3rd-4th place match

Final

Final ranking

References 

1969
Maccabiah Games